{{DISPLAYTITLE:C7H10N2}}
The molecular formula C7H10N2 may refer to:

 Diaminotoluenes
 2,4-Diaminotoluene
 2,5-Diaminotoluene
 4-Dimethylaminopyridine
 2-Pyridylethylamine
 2,3,5-Trimethylpyrazine

Molecular formulas